Nanhu station may refer to:

Nanhu station (Chongqing Rail Transit), a metro station on the Loop line, Chongqing, China
Nanhu station (Hangzhou Metro), a metro station on Line 16, Hangzhou, Zhejiang, China
Nanhu station (Nanning Metro), a metro station on Line 1, Nanning, Guangxi, China